Leucoptera lustratella is a moth in the Lyonetiidae family. It is found from Fennoscandia to the Pyrenees and Italy and from France to Belarus and Romania.

The larvae feed on Hypericum hirsutum, Hypericum montanum and Hypericum perforatum. They mine the leaves of their host plant. The mine consists of an upper surface brown blotch, which is small and round at first. It is enlarged by lobe-like extensions in all directions. The mine usually begins at the leaf tip. The frass is concentrated in the centre of the mine. Pupation mostly takes place in a whitish cocoon within the mine. The larvae may leave a mined leaf and restart elsewhere.

References

Leucoptera (moth)
Moths described in 1855
Moths of Europe